Lebègue is a French surname. People with this surname include the following:

 Nicolas Lebègue (1631–1702), French composer and organist
 Henri Lebègue (1856–1938), French palaeographer
  (1862–1943), French historian, brother of the former
  (1863–1944), French lithographer
 Raymond Lebègue (1895–1984), son of Henri, 20th-century French literary historian.
  (1814–1885), publisher from Brussels

See also 
 Victor-Amédée Lebesgue (1791–1875), French mathematician
 Henri Lebesgue (1875–1941), French mathematician